Pasadena Hills is an unincorporated community and census-designated place in Pasco County, Florida, United States. Its population was 7,570 as of the 2010 census. The community was originally planned in 1925.

Geography

References

Unincorporated communities in Pasco County, Florida
Unincorporated communities in Florida
Census-designated places in Pasco County, Florida
Census-designated places in Florida